Hans Einar Granath (28 October 1936 – 5 January 1993) was a Swedish ice hockey player. He was part of the Swedish team that finished fifth at the 1960 Winter Olympics. He served as the Swedish Olympic flag bearer at those Games.

References

Olympic ice hockey players of Sweden
Ice hockey players at the 1960 Winter Olympics
1936 births
1993 deaths